Dalmacio Langarica Lizasoain (5 December 1919 – 24 January 1985) was a Spanish professional road racing cyclist during the 1940s and 1950s and a directeur sportif in the 1970s.

Langarica rode to victory over 23 stages and across  to win the sixth edition of his country's Grand Tour, the 1946 Vuelta a España. He was accompanied to the podium by runner-up Julián Berrendero, third place Jan Lambrichs, fourth place Manuel Costa and defending champion Delio Rodríguez in fifth place.

At the 1948 Vuelta, Langarica tried desperately to best eventual winner Bernardo Ruiz but suffered a bad fall during the stage between A Coruña and Ourense. He ended finishing fourth overall and second in the climbers classification.

After finishing his competitive cycling career, Langarica became a directeur sportif, including serving as manager for the all-Spaniard cycling team, KAS, which included Francisco Galdós, who finished in 8th place (the highest finish of a Spaniard at the 1970 Tour de France.

Major results
1944
 1st, Subida al Naranco
1946
 1st, Overall, Vuelta a España
1948
 4th, Overall, Vuelta a España

References

External links

1919 births
1985 deaths
Spanish male cyclists
Vuelta a España winners
People from Durangaldea
Sportspeople from Biscay
Cyclists from the Basque Country (autonomous community)